Paragymnopteris is a genus of ferns in the subfamily Cheilanthoideae of the family Pteridaceae. Species of Paragymnopteris are native to the Old World.

Species
, the Checklist of Ferns and Lycophytes of the World recognized the following species:
Paragymnopteris bipinnata (Christ) K.H.Shing
Paragymnopteris borealisinensis (Kitag.) comb. ined.
Paragymnopteris delavayi (Baker) K.H.Shing
Paragymnopteris marantae (L.) K.H.Shing
Paragymnopteris sargentii (Christ) K.H.Shing
Paragymnopteris vestita (Wall. ex C.Presl) K.H.Shing

References

Pteridaceae
Fern genera